Malachi Richardson (born January 5, 1996) is an American professional basketball player for GTK Gliwice of the Polish Basketball League (PLK). He played one season of college basketball for Syracuse before being selected by the Charlotte Hornets with the 22nd overall pick in the 2016 NBA draft.

High school and college career
Richardson attended Trenton Catholic Academy his freshman year, then spent his sophomore year at Roselle Catholic High School before returning to Trenton Catholic Academy for his junior and senior years, to team back up with coach Fred Falchi, who came out of retirement to coach. In his high school career at Trenton Catholic Academy, Malachi scored a total 1,245 points, averaging 19.2 points in his junior year and 18.7 in his senior year. Richardson was rated as a four-star recruit and ranked 23rd overall recruit and 5th best shooting guard in the 2015 high school class.

Richardson played one season of college basketball for Syracuse, averaging 13.4 points, 4.3 rebounds and 2.1 assists per game. Richardson was also named to the ACC All-Freshman team. On April 18, 2016, he declared for the NBA draft, forgoing his final three years of college eligibility.

Professional career

Sacramento Kings (2016–2018)
On June 23, 2016, Richardson was selected by the Charlotte Hornets with the 22nd overall pick in the 2016 NBA draft. His rights were later traded to the Sacramento Kings on July 7, 2016, in exchange for Marco Belinelli. On July 15, 2016, he signed his rookie scale contract with the Kings. On February 16, 2017, he was ruled out for four to six weeks after suffering a partial thickness tear of his right hamstring the night before. He was later shut down for the remainder of the season on March 26, 2017. During his season and a half with the Kings, he had multiple assignments with the Reno Bighorns of the NBA G League.

Toronto Raptors (2018–2019)
On February 8, 2018, Richardson was traded to the Toronto Raptors in exchange for Bruno Caboclo. On February 11, in Charlotte, he played in his first game with the Raptors. During the rest of the season, he received multiple assignments to Raptors 905, Toronto's G League affiliate.

On February 6, 2019, Richardson was traded to the Philadelphia 76ers, where he was waived the following day.

Hapoel Holon (2019)
On March 14, 2019, the Canton Charge of the NBA G League announced that they had added Richardson, but he did not make any appearances for the Charge.

On August 17, 2019, Richardson signed with Hapoel Holon of the Israeli Premier League for the 2019–20 season. On November 30, 2019, Richardson recorded a career-high 24 points, while shooting 6-of-7 from three-point range, along with five assists in a 109–95 win over Ironi Nahariya. In 15 games played for Holon, he averaged 11.6 points and 2 assists per game. On December 14, 2019, he parted ways with Holon.

Vanoli Cremona (2019–2020)
On December 16, 2019, Richardson signed with Vanoli Cremona in the Italian Lega Basket Serie A as a replacement for Vojislav Stojanović. However, he had an unfortunate experience in Cremona: one month after his debut with the team he fractured his right hand during the match against Virtus Roma on January 26. He underwent a surgery and was released from the team on February 11.

Canton Charge (2021)
For the 2020–21 season, Richardson joined the Canton Charge of the G League where he played 15 games, averaging 8.4 ppg while shooting 46% from beyond the arc.

Lavoropiù Fortitudo Bologna (2021)
On July 30, 2021, Richardson signed with Lavoropiù Fortitudo Bologna of the Lega Basket Serie A. After playing in six games averaging 10.3 points per game, he parted ways with the team on November 12.

Wilki Morskie Szczecin (2021–2022)
On November 16, 2021, Richardson signed with Wilki Morskie Szczecin of the PLK.

GTK Gliwice (2022–present)
On December 17, 2022, he signed with GTK Gliwice of the Polish Basketball League (PLK).

Career statistics

NBA

Regular season

|-
| style="text-align:left;"| 
| style="text-align;left;"| Sacramento
| 22 || 0 || 9.0 || .412 || .286 || .789 || 1.0 || .5 || .2 || .0 || 3.6
|-
| style="text-align:left;" rowspan="2"| 
| style="text-align;left;"| Sacramento
| 25 || 4 || 12.8 || .330 || .308 || .773 || 1.3 || .5 || .4 || .0 || 3.5
|-
| style="text-align:left;"| Toronto
| 1 || 0 || 5.0 || .500 || .000 || .000 || 1.0 || .0 || .0 || .0 || 2.0
|-
| style="text-align:left;"| 
| style="text-align:left;"| Toronto
| 22 || 0 || 4.7 || .310 || .320 || .800 || .6 || .0 || .0 || .0 || 1.4
|- class="sortbottom"
| style="text-align:center;" colspan="2"| Career
| 70 || 4 || 8.9 || .358 || .301 || .783 || 1.0 || .3 || .2 || .0 || 2.8

College

|-
| style="text-align:left;"| 2015–16
| style="text-align:left;"| Syracuse
| 37 || 37 || 34.4 || .369 || .353 || .720 || 4.3 || 2.1 || 1.1 || .3 || 13.4

References

External links

Syracuse Orange bio
RealGM profile

1996 births
Living people
21st-century African-American sportspeople
African-American basketball players
American expatriate basketball people in Canada
American expatriate basketball people in Israel
American expatriate basketball people in Italy
American men's basketball players
Basketball players from Trenton, New Jersey
Canton Charge players
Charlotte Hornets draft picks
Hapoel Holon players
McDonald's High School All-Americans
Parade High School All-Americans (boys' basketball)
Raptors 905 players
Reno Bighorns players
Roselle Catholic High School alumni
Sacramento Kings players
Shooting guards
Small forwards
Syracuse Orange men's basketball players
Toronto Raptors players
Trenton Catholic Academy alumni